{{Infobox song
| name       = Troglodyte (Cave Man)
| cover      = troglodyte(JCB).jpg
| alt        =
| border     = yes
| caption    = Single cover artwork
| type       = single
| artist     = Jimmy Castor Bunch
| album      = It's Just Begun
| B-side     = I Promise to Remember
| released   = 1972
| recorded   =
| studio     =
| venue      =
| genre      = Funk
| length     = 3:363:22 (7" version)
| label      = RCA
| composer   =
| lyricist   =
| producer   =
| prev_title =
| prev_year  =
| next_title =
| next_year  =
| misc       = {{Extra album cover
 | header  =
 | type    = single
 | cover   = Troglodyte(alternate).jpg
 | border  = yes
 | alt     =
 | caption = <small>Alternate single artwork, as released in Germany. Derivative of It's Just Beguns artwork.</small>
}}
}}

"Troglodyte (Cave Man)", originally released as "Troglodite'''", is a 1972 novelty funk song by the Jimmy Castor Bunch. In the US, it peaked at No. 4 on the R&B chart and No. 6 on the Billboard Hot 100. Billboard ranked it as the No. 80 song for 1972. The song has been sampled in hip-hop and dance music.
In Canada, the song reached No. 1 for two weeks in July 1972, and was No. 29 on the RPM''/Kowal year-end chart.

A character introduced in the song, Bertha Butt ("one of the Butt Sisters"), was featured in many later Castor Bunch songs, including "The Bertha Butt Boogie" (1975).

"Troglodyte" sold over half-a-million copies, and has been certified gold by the RIAA.

References

1972 songs
1972 singles
Fiction set in prehistory
RCA Records singles